The 2018 Vancouver Whitecaps FC season is the club's eighth season in Major League Soccer, the top division of soccer in the United States and Canada. Including previous iterations of the franchise, this is 41st season of professional soccer being played in Vancouver under a variation of the "Whitecaps" name.

Outside of MLS, the Whitecaps played in the 2018 Canadian Championship. They defeated the Montreal Impact 2–1 on aggregate in the semifinals before falling 7–4 on aggregate to Toronto FC in the finals.

On September 25, with five games remaining in the season the Whitecaps released manager Carl Robinson along with assistant coaches Martyn Pert, Gordon Forrest and goalkeeper coach Stewart Kerr. Whitecaps Academy technical director Craig Dalrymple was named acting manager for the remainder of the season.

Current roster

Transfers

In

Out

Major League Soccer

Preseason

Regular season

League tables

Western Conference

Overall

Results

Canadian Championship

Playing statistics

Appearances (Apps.) numbers are for appearances in competitive games only including sub appearances
Red card numbers denote:   Numbers in parentheses represent red cards overturned for wrongful dismissal.

References

Vancouver Whitecaps
Vancouver Whitecaps
Vancouver Whitecaps
Vancouver Whitecaps FC seasons